Erlangen Manuscript is a Serbian Cyrillic manuscript dated between 1716 and 1733 that contains one of the earliest written collections (217 songs) of epic poetry written in the Serbian language. The unnamed author wrote the manuscript for the Austrian military commander Prince Eugene of Savoy, a governor in Habsburg-occupied Serbia. It was discovered in 1913 by the Germanist Elias von Steinmeyer in the University Library in Erlangen and studied in depth by Gerhard Gesemann who used it for his habilitation in 1921. It was first published to the public in Sremski Karlovci in 1925.

The Erlangen Manuscript is mixture of Christian and Muslim songs. Estimates of the number of Muslim songs vary between 36 and 46.

References

Sources

South Slavic history
Folk music publications
Serbian folklore
Serbian manuscripts
Serbian epic poetry
Cyrillic manuscripts
18th-century manuscripts